Bo Becker (born 1971) is a Swedish economist, and Professor of Financial Economics at the Stockholm School of Economics, known for his work on rating, reputation and competition.

Life and work 
Becker obtained his MSc in economics from the Stockholm School of Economics in 1995, and his PhD in finance at the University of Chicago in 2005 with the thesis, entitled "Geographical Segmentation of US Capital Markets," under Luigi Zingales.

In 2004 Becker started his academic career as research assistant at the University of Illinois at Urbana–Champaign. In 2009 he moved to the Harvard Business School, where he was appointed Assistant Professor of Business Administration. In 2013 back in Sweden he was appointed Professor of Financial Economics at the Stockholm School of Economics.

Selected publications 
 Becker, Bo, and Todd Milbourn.Reputation and competition: evidence from the credit rating industry. Harvard Business School, 2008.

Articles, a selection:
 Becker, Bo. "Wealth and executive compensation." The Journal of Finance 61.1 (2006): 379-397.
 Becker, Bo, and Todd Milbourn. "How did increased competition affect credit ratings?." Journal of Financial Economics 101.3 (2011): 493-514.

References

External links 
 Bo Becker, Stockholm School of Economic

1971 births
Living people
Swedish economists
Swedish business theorists
Stockholm School of Economics alumni
University of Chicago Booth School of Business alumni
University of Illinois Urbana-Champaign faculty
Harvard Business School faculty
Academic staff of the Stockholm School of Economics
Academic staff of the Chalmers University of Technology